Jamaica competed at the 1952 Summer Olympics in Helsinki, Finland.

Medalists

Gold
 Arthur Wint, Leslie Laing, Herb McKenley, and George Rhoden — Athletics, Men's 4 x 400 metres relay 
 George Rhoden — Athletics, Men's 400 metres

Silver
 Herb McKenley — Athletics, Men's 100 metres
 Herb McKenley — Athletics, Men's 400 metres
 Arthur Wint — Athletics, Men's 800 metres

Results and competitors by event

Athletics
Men's 100 metres
 Herb McKenley
 First Round – 10.7
 First Round – 10.5
 Semifinals – 10.4
 Final – 10.4 (→  Silver Medal)

Cycling

Track Competition
Men's 1.000m Time Trial
Kenneth Farnum
 Final — 1:17.2 (→ 20th place)

Men's 1.000m Sprint Scratch Race
Kenneth Farnum — 21st place

References
Official Olympic Reports
International Olympic Committee results database

Nations at the 1952 Summer Olympics
1952 Summer Olympics